Francis II (François de Lorraine; 27 February 1572 – 14 October 1632) was the son of Charles III, Duke of Lorraine and Claude of Valois. He was Duke of Lorraine briefly in 1625, quickly abdicating in favour of his son.

Biography

The youngest son of Charles III, Duke of Lorraine, and his wife Claude of France, Francis was styled the Count of Vaudémont during his father's reign (1545–1608) as well as during that of his older brother Henry II (1608–1624). His father appointed him as his deputy (Lieutenant General) of Lorraine, while in 1594 he was out of the country.

That same year he was Lieutenant General of the French king in Toul and Verdun. From September to October 1606 he was in his father's diplomatic mission in England. Rowland Whyte mentioned him dancing at Hampton Court in the presence chamber of Anne of Denmark. He spent much of the time hunting with King James away from London, where there was plague. They returned to Hampton Court and James gave him a jewel worth 10,000 crowns.

In 1621 he fell out with his brother Henry II, who had become duke in 1608, and went to Germany for the emperor to fight the Protestants. The reason for the rift was Henry's intention to have Francis's son Charles marry Henry II's daughter Nicolette of Lorraine and to leave Lorraine to her, even though the will of Duke René II had provided for a strictly male succession. Henry and his wife Margherita Gonzaga had only had daughters. After negotiations, the issue was then resolved and the marriage took place but the couple did not have any children and the duchy was to revert to Francis' other son, the future Nicholas II, Duke of Lorraine. 

After Francis' brother died on 31 July 1624, the situation became complicated; Henry's final rules specified that Charles could only be the Duke of Lorraine as Nicolette's husband.

In November 1625, however, it was Francis himself who became the ruler of Lorraine.  Having claimed the duchy for himself, he got it on 21 November 1625 from the duchy's States General.

After he had paid the duchy's debt out of its treasury five days later, he abdicated in favour of his son, who by then had pushed aside his wife and who then ruled in his own right.

In his will, Francis stated that he "never had ambitions to wear a crown in this world". After his abdication, Francis II took on the management of the county of Vaudémont. He died less than a year later.

Family

He married Christina of Salm and had the following issue:

 Henri de Lorraine, Marquis of Hattonchâtel (1602–1611) died young;
 Charles de Lorraine, Duke of Lorraine (1604–1675) married Nicolette of Lorraine, no issue; married (bigamously) Béatrix de Cusance and had issue;
 Henriette de Lorraine (1605–1660), married Louis de Lorraine, Prince of Lexin, son of Louis II, Cardinal of Guise, no issue;
 Nicolas, Duke of Lorraine (1609–1670), married Claude de Lorraine and had issue;
 Marguerite de Lorraine (1615–1672), married Gaston de France, Duke of Orléans and had issue;
 Christine de Lorraine (1621–1622) died in infancy.

Ancestry

See also

References

Sources

1572 births
1632 deaths
Nobility from Nancy, France
Dukes of Lorraine
Princes of Lorraine
16th-century French nobility
17th-century French nobility